Lazy Dog may refer to:

 Lazy Dog (night club), a popular night club at Notting Hill Arts Club in west London
 Lazy Dog (bomb), a cluster bomb used in World War II and in the Vietnam War

See also

 The quick brown fox jumps over the lazy dog